Charles Edward Chapel (May 16, 1904 - February 20, 1967) was a politician and technical writer, best known for his articles and books about firearms.

Early life
Chapel was born in Manchester, Iowa on May 16, 1904.  He studied at the University of Missouri and later at the Naval Academy in Annapolis.  
He saw active service in Panama, Cuba, Nicaragua, the Philippines, and China.  He was discharged in 1937 after being wounded.

Writing career
Chapel wrote about a variety of subjects such as aviation and forensics, as well as firearms. The exact number of articles is not known, but could be as high as several thousand, including 3,000 for Hobbies Magazine.

After his military career, he worked as an aeronautical engineer at Northrop Aeronautical Institute in California and wrote or helped edit many of the technical manuals for the industry. He also wrote several articles on ballistics and fingerprinting for the police.

Politics
Chapel was active in several organizations, including the NRA and the Veterans of Foreign Wars. 
Based on a pro-gun stance, Chapel entered Republican politics in 1950, serving in the California State Assembly for the 46th district from 1951 until he died in office in 1967.  He was a Presidential Elector in 1956.

Books
Although he wrote articles on a variety of subjects, most of his books were about firearms, starting with Gun Collecting in 1939.  His 1940 book, The Gun Collector's Handbook of Values was one of the first to provide values for non-professionals, and he contributed to later editions for many years.  From the 40s until his death, he wrote at least nine books on gun topics.

His most well-known book, Guns of the Old West, is considered a standard reference for Western firearms studies.

Death
Chapel died on February 20, 1967, in Sacramento, California from a heart attack in his sleep.

References 

Who's Who in Firearms, Hobbies, Jan 1951.
American Authors and Bookmen, 1972.
Obit, The American Rifleman, April 1967.

External links

American technology writers
American instructional writers
Gun writers
1904 births
1967 deaths
Republican Party members of the California State Assembly
United States Naval Academy alumni
People from Manchester, Iowa
20th-century American non-fiction writers
20th-century American politicians
Military personnel from Iowa